St James's Church (French - Eglise Saint-Jacques) is a church dedicated to James the Less in the Belgian city of Liège, founded in 1015 by bishop Baldrick II as the church for a Benedictine abbey. On the demolition of St Peter's Church it became one of the seven collegiate churches in the city. Its chapter was abolished in 1801 and the church converted into a parish church.

It retains its original Romanesque narthex on the west side, whilst the rest of the church is in the late Gothic style, with richly-decorated nave vaulting dating to between 1514 and 1538. Lambert Lombard added a Renaissance-style porch, whilst several 16th century stained glass windows survive in the church itself and the 17th century limewood sculptures down both sides of the nave are by Jean Del Cour.

Sources
https://www.steden.net/belgie/luik/sint-jacobskerk/

Saint-Jacques
1015 establishments